Patriarch Cyril may refer to:

 Patriarch Cyril I of Alexandria (ruled in 412–444)
 Cyril Lucaris (1572–1638)
 Patriarch Cyril of Constantinople (disambiguation) (seven Patriarchs from 1612 to 1860)
 Cyril of Bulgaria (ruled in 1901–1971)
 Cyril I of Moscow and All Russia, since 2009
 Patriarch Cyril II of Jerusalem, (ruled (1846–1872)
 Pope Cyril II of Alexandria (ruled 1078–1092)
 Patriarch Cyril II of Alexandria, Greek Patriarch of Alexandria in the 12th century
 Patriarch Cyril II of Jerusalem (ruled in 1846–1872)
 Cyril III of Alexandria, Greek Patriarch of Alexandria in 1601–1620
 Patriarch Cyril V Zaim (died 1720)
 Cyril VI Tanas (1680–1760), Patriarch of the Melkite Greek Catholic Church
 Pope Cyril VI of Alexandria (1902–1971), Pope and Patriarch of the Coptic Orthodox Church of Alexandria
 Cyril VII Siaj (died 1796), Patriarch of the Melkite Greek Catholic Church (ruled 1794–1796)
 Cyril VIII Jaha, Patriarch of the Melkite Greek Catholic Church (ruled 1902–1916)
 Cyril IX Moghabghab (1855–1947), Patriarch of the Melkite Greek Catholic Church (ruled 1925–1947)

See also
 Patriarch Kirilo (disambiguation)